Marvin Matip (born 25 September 1985) is a former professional footballer who played as a centre-back. Born in Germany, he represented the Cameroon national team at international level.

Club career 
Born in Bochum, Matip began his career with VfL Bochum, but moved to 1. FC Köln in 2005. On 1 February 2010, he was loaned to Karlsruher SC.

International career 
Matip represented German youth sides at Under 19 and Under-21 level in competitions including the 2005 FIFA World Youth Championship and the 2006 UEFA European Under-21 Football Championship, but was called up to the Cameroon national team in 2007 after announcing his desire to represent Cameroon. However, his career with Cameroon was delayed after the correct paperwork was not filed with FIFA in time. He made his international debut with Les Lions Indomptables in a friendly match against Ukraine on 2 June 2013.

Personal life 
Matip was born to a Cameroonian father and a German mother, and as such was eligible to represent either nation.

His father Jean is a former footballer and his brother Joël Matip plays for Liverpool. He is also the cousin of Joseph-Désiré Job.

References

External links 
 
 
 
 

1985 births
Living people
Sportspeople from Bochum
German people of Cameroonian descent
Cameroonian people of German descent
German sportspeople of African descent
Sportspeople of Cameroonian descent
Citizens of Cameroon through descent
German footballers
Cameroonian footballers
Association football defenders
Germany under-21 international footballers
Germany youth international footballers
Cameroon international footballers
Bundesliga players
2. Bundesliga players
VfL Bochum players
VfL Bochum II players
1. FC Köln players
1. FC Köln II players
Karlsruher SC players
FC Ingolstadt 04 players
Footballers from North Rhine-Westphalia